Munslow is a small village and civil parish in Shropshire, England.

The village formed part of and gave its name to the hundred of Munslow which had various local administrative and legal functions for centuries, until the Local Government Act 1894.

Location
Munslow is located in the mid-southern region of Shropshire. It borders the Shropshire Hills Area of Outstanding Natural Beauty. The nearest sizeable town is Craven Arms, its post town, at 7 miles' distance. Less than a mile to the southwest, also on the B4368, is the village of Aston Munslow, which also has its own pub, The Swan. Also within the wide, rural parish are the hamlets of Broadstone, Little London and Upper Millichope. Running through the village is the small stream called 'Corve Brook'; this flows into the larger River Corve to the south of the village.

The Corvedale Three Castles Walk starts in Aston Munlow and goes through Munslow.

History
Munslow as a settlement has a history dating back at least 1,000 years, with Munslow a part of the manor of Aston, which featured in the Domesday Book. The name Munslow derives from a place at a mound or tumulus ("-low") but the meaning of the first element ("Muns") is unclear. Aston Munslow was originally simply Aston, but its proximity to Munslow (which was chosen as the name for the hundred) meant it became known as Aston Munslow and in some old maps Munslow's Aston.

Munslow is a historic village with over 29 houses being listed grade II or above, although it has never had any major historical significance, the 'hundred house' of Munslow hundred acted as the centre for local administration and judicial functions for many centuries.

The grade I listed church 12th-century parish church, is dedicated to Saint Michael. and contains volumes of parish records and registers dating back to the 16th century.

The Reverend Francis Stedman, the father of the famous pioneering 17th century change ringer  Fabian Stedman was born in Aston Munslow in 1598. Also born there were judge Edward Littleton (made a peer as Baron Lyttelton of Munslow) in 1589, and Victorian architect Samuel Pountney Smith in 1812.
The folk singer Fred Jordan (1922-2002) lived at Aston Munslow until 2001.

The village

The 'hundred house' for Munslow hundred was originally located in Aston Munslow, but has stood in Munslow since the Tudor times and is now a local restaurant and pub known as 'The Crown Country Inn'.

Today, Munslow is a sparsely spread village with no community recreation area. At the centre of the village, however, there is a large World War II memorial, a village notice board, an antiquated water trough and a post box.

White House

The White House in Aston Munslow is a medieval hall house that has undergone considerable alteration over the centuries. It is a grade II* listed building.

Millichope Park

Millichope Park is a Greek Revival country house which stands in 220 acres (90 Hectares) of ornamental parkland. It also is a Grade II* listed building.

Hundred

During the reign of Henry I the hundred of Munslow was formed; previously the manor of Aston (which Munslow belonged to) formed part of the Saxon hundred of Culvestan. Munslow hundred was formed from the majority of manors in the hundreds of Culvestan and Patton, along with some from Leintwardine which was being dissolved. The hundred of Munslow was divided into "upper" and "lower" divisions. Although never formally abolished, the hundreds of England have become obsolete.

Education
Munslow was home to a school until 1982. It was located in the centre of the village where 'The Old School House' stands today. The name is not known, but at the height of its catchment in 1902, at least 98 pupils were believed to have regularly attended class.

Schools in Munslow history:
 1573 to Unknown – Local rector gave basic education.
 18th century – Dame schools
 Unknown to c.1842 – Munslow old farm house.
 c.1849 to 1982 – Munslow old farm house re-opened as a 'National School'.
 1943 to 1945 – Roman Catholic school evacuated from Kent during World War II.
 1948 to 1962 (moved) – Boys' secondary boarding school at Millichope Park.

Local business

Munslow has a number of businesses: the Crown Country Inn, Coseley House Bed & Breakfast  and the Crown Garage (currently closed). The Crown Country Inn is situated at the south end of the village and was formally the area's 'hundred house'. It is now the hub of the community, and also provides accommodation for guests. The building itself is Grade II listed and comprises architecture ranging from the 17th through the 19th centuries.

The Wildgoose Nursery at Lower Millichope is a new venture in the Walled Garden of Millichope Park. It was created in 2011 to safeguard the Bouts collection of Perennial Violas, Wildegoose Nursery has gained a reputation for both its violas and an extensive range of perennials and grasses. At the centre of the garden sits the newly restored range of Georgian curvilinear glasshouses; restored with the aid of grants from the Heritage Lottery Fund and The Country Houses Association.

The village does not have a shop (the Post Office which closed in the early 1990s was situated in the Old Bakery), but there is one in the Aston Munslow Garage, one mile away south towards Craven Arms.

Transport
Public bus service:
An infrequent bus runs between Lydbury North and Telford, stopping en route at the Crown Inn on Tuesdays. It does not run every week and the timetable varies. There is a local Dial-a-Ride service, The Buzzard which provides transport to nearby towns.

School bus services:
During weekdays and term time, two services run between Cardington and Ludlow. They also stop at the Crown Inn.

Rail services: 
The nearest railway station is Craven Arms. It is 7.0 miles away and has regular services to Shrewsbury.

The nearest airport is Birmingham Airport at just under 60 miles away.

Governance
The village of Munslow is in the parish of Munslow, which also includes Aston Munslow and the hamlets of Broadstone, Hungerford and Beambridge.

See also
Listed buildings in Munslow

References

External links

 Munslow parish church historical registers
 Detailed history of Munslow parish
 Listed buildings in Munslow parish
 The Crown Country Inn Munslow
 Munslow Parish council

Villages in Shropshire
Civil parishes in Shropshire